Gymnoscelis bryodes is a moth in the family Geometridae. It was described by Alfred Jefferis Turner in 1907. It is found in Australia (Kuranda, Queensland).

References

Moths described in 1907
bryodes